Helwangspitz is a mountain in Liechtenstein in the Rätikon range of the Eastern Alps, to the east of Vaduz, with a height of  / or 2000 m.

References

Mountains of the Alps
Mountains of Liechtenstein